My Mexican Shivah is a 2007 Mexican-American comedy film directed by Alejandro Springall and starring Raquel Pankowsky, David Ostrosky and Sergio Kleiner.

Cast
Raquel Pankowsky
David Ostrosky
Sharon Zundel
Emilio Savinni
Sergio Kleiner

Reception
The film has a 43% rating on Rotten Tomatoes.  Eric Henderson of Slant Magazine awarded the film two stars out of four.

References

External links
 
 

2000s Hebrew-language films
2000s Spanish-language films
Yiddish-language films
Mexican comedy films
American comedy films
2007 comedy films
2007 films
2000s American films
2000s Mexican films
2007 multilingual films
Mexican multilingual films
American multilingual films